Turn and Face Me is the third studio album by Los Angeles band the Blood Arm, released worldwide on July 4, 2011, almost five years after their previous album Lie Lover Lie. Recorded in Burbank, California, it was produced by David Newton, from the popular late '80s band the Mighty Lemon Drops.

Release and reception
Turn and Face Me received generally positive reviews. In their 8/10 review, Punk Rock ist nicht tot described the album as "bubbly, infectious, inventive pop" and "fun with a capital ‘F’" while Q Magazine called the album "playfully knowing indie rock that could almost be a collision between The Scots and The Boomtown Rats", though the album also drew comparisons with Roxy Music, Kevin Rowland and the Doors.

The band promoted the album with a lengthy European tour, beginning and eventually culminating in Germany. The promotional tour included an appearance on Berlin Live (a popular music show from Berlin) alongside Art Brut and dEUS.

Track listing

Credits
Nathaniel Fregoso - vocals
Zebastian Carlisle - guitar
Dyan Valdes - keyboards
Zachary Amos - drums
Louis Castle - trumpet

Produced by The Blood Arm, David Newton & Josiah Mazzaschi.

References
 

2011 albums
The Blood Arm albums